Musa lolodensis is a species of wild banana (genus Musa), occurring naturally from the Moluccas through to New Guinea. It is placed in section Callimusa (now including the former section Australimusa), having a diploid chromosome number of 2n = 20. It is one of the possible parents of the cultivated Fe'i bananas.

Distribution
Musa lolodensis is native to Indonesia (in Halmahera of the Moluccas, and Papua) and northwestern Papua New Guinea.

References

lolodensis
Flora of the Maluku Islands
Flora of New Guinea
Plants described in 1950